Hennediella is a genus of mosses belonging to the family Pottiaceae.

The genus name of Hennediella is in honour of Roger Hennedy (1809 - 1877), who was a Scottish printer and botanist (Pteridology).

The genus was circumscribed by Jean Édouard Gabriel Narcisse Paris in Index bryologicus (Paris) vol.2 on page 557 in 1895.

The genus has cosmopolitan distribution.

Species:
 Hennediella acletoi Zander, 1993
 Hennediella acutidentata Zander, 1993

References

Pottiaceae
Moss genera